Rosengård is a southeastern neighbourhood of  Odense, in Funen, Denmark.  It contains the Rosengårdcentret buildings.

References

Suburbs of Odense